Natsiatopsis is a monotypic genus of flowering plants belonging to the family Icacinaceae. The only species is Natsiatopsis thunbergiifolia.

Its native range is Eastern Himalaya to Southern Central China.

References

Icacinaceae
Monotypic asterid genera